The 99th Assembly District of Wisconsin is one of 99 districts in the Wisconsin State Assembly.  Located in southeastern Wisconsin, the district comprises part of northwest Waukesha County, including the city of Delafield and the villages of Chenequa, Hartland, Lac La Belle, Merton, Nashotah, and Wales.  The district is represented by Republican Cindi Duchow, since October 2015.

The 99th Assembly district is located within Wisconsin's 33rd Senate district, along with the 97th and 98th Assembly districts.

List of past representatives

References 

Wisconsin State Assembly districts
Waukesha County, Wisconsin